

Matches
Scores and results list New Zealand's points tally first.

Touring party

Manager: Vincent Meredith
Assistant manager:
Captain: Jack Manchester

Full-back
 Mike Gilbert (West Coast)

Three-quarters
 Nelson Ball (Wellington)
 Henry Brown (Auckland)
 George Hart (Canterbury)
 Neville Mitchell (Southland)
 Charlie Oliver (Canterbury)

Five-eighths
 Jack Griffiths (Wellington)
 Harcourt Caughey (Auckland)
 Rusty Page (Wellington)
 Dave Solomon (Auckland)
 Eric Tindill (Wellington)

Halfbacks
 Merv Corner (Auckland)
 Joey Sadler (Wellington)

Forwards
 George Adkins (South Canterbury)
 Jack Best (Marlborough)
 Bill Collins (Hawke's Bay)
 Douglas Dalton (Hawke's Bay)
 William Edward Hadley (Auckland)
 John Hore (Otago)
 Ronald King (West Coast)
 Arthur Lambourn (Wellington)
 Atholstan Mahoney (Bush Districts)
 Jack Manchester (Cantebury)
 Rod MacKenzie (Manawatu)
 Hubert McLean (Auckland)
 Cyril Pepper (Auckland)
 Tori Reid (Hawke's Bay)
 Frederick Vorrath (Otago)
 James Wynyard (Waikato)

The matches

Scotland

Ireland

Wales

Wales: Vivian Jenkins (London Welsh), Geoffrey Rees-Jones (Oxford Univ.), Idwal Rees (Swansea), Claude Davey (Swansea) (capt.), Wilf Wooller (Cambridge Univ.), Cliff Jones (Cambridge Univ.), Haydn Tanner (Swansea), Tom Rees (Newport), Don Tarr, (Swansea), Harry Payne (Swansea), Trevor Williams (Cross Keys), Eddie Watkins (Cardiff), Glyn Prosser (Neath), Jim Lang (Llanelli), Arthur Rees (London Welsh)

New Zealand: G Gilbert, GF Hart, NA Mitchell, N Ball, CJ Oliver, JL Griffiths, BS Sadler, A Lambourn, WE Hadley, D Dalton, ST Reid, RR King, JE Manchester (capt.), A Mahoney, HF McLean

England

Tour Box

External links
 1935–1936 Tour in Details
 Film of the All Blacks playing in Vancouver BC January 25th 1936 at Brockton Oval in Stanley Park 

1935 rugby union tours
1936 rugby union tours
1935 in New Zealand rugby union
1936 in New Zealand rugby union
1935-36
1935-36
Rugby union tours of England
Rugby union tours of Ireland
Rugby union tours of Scotland
Rugby union tours of Wales
1936 in Canadian rugby union
1935–36 in English rugby union
Rugby union
Rugby union
1935–36 in Welsh rugby union
1935–36 in Scottish rugby union